Theispas (also known as Teisheba or Teišeba) of Kumenu was the Araratian (Urartian) weather-god, notably the god of storms and thunder. He was also sometimes the god of war. He is the son of Habli. He formed part of a triad along with Khaldi and Shivini. The ancient Araratian cities of Teyseba and Teishebaini were named after Theispas. He is a counterpart to the Assyrian god Adad, the Vedic God Indra, and the Hurrian god, Teshub. He was often depicted as a man standing on a bull, holding a handful of thunderbolts. His wife was the goddess Huba, who was the counterpart of the Hurrian goddess Hebat.

See also
Teshup
Urartu
Teispes

References

Urartian deities
Sky and weather gods